William Gregory Strother (born January 8, 1982) is a former American football linebacker in the National Football League for the Miami Dolphins and Washington Redskins.  He played college football at the University of New Mexico.

References

1982 births
Living people
Sportspeople from Evansville, Indiana
American football linebackers
Washington Redskins players
Miami Dolphins players